The International Electrotechnical Commission (IEC; in French: Commission électrotechnique internationale) is an international standards organization that prepares and publishes international standards for all electrical, electronic and related technologies – collectively known as "electrotechnology". IEC standards cover a vast range of technologies from power generation, transmission and distribution to home appliances and office equipment, semiconductors, fibre optics, batteries, solar energy, nanotechnology and marine energy as well as many others. The IEC also manages four global conformity assessment systems that certify weather equipment, system or components conform to its international standards.

All electrotechnologies are covered by IEC Standards, including energy production and distribution, electronics, magnetics and electromagnetics, electroacoustics, multimedia, telecommunication and medical technology, as well as associated general disciplines such as terminology and symbols, electromagnetic compatibility, measurement and performance, dependability, design and development, safety and the environment.

History
The first  International Electrical Congress took place in 1881 at the  International Exposition of Electricity, held in Paris. At that time the International System of Electrical and Magnetic Units was agreed to.

The International Electrotechnical Commission held its inaugural meeting on 26 June 1906, following discussions among the British Institution of Electrical Engineers, the American Institute of Electrical Engineers, and others, which began at the 1900 Paris International Electrical Congress,, with British engineer R. E. B. Crompton playing a key role. In 1906, Lord Kelvin was elected as the first President of the International Electrotechnical Commission.

The IEC was instrumental in developing and distributing standards for units of measurement, particularly the gauss, hertz, and weber. It was also first to promote the Giorgi System of standards, later developed into the SI, or Système International d'unités (in English, the International System of Units).

In 1938, it published a multilingual international vocabulary to unify terminology relating to electrical, electronic and related technologies. This effort continues, and the International Electrotechnical Vocabulary is published online as the Electropedia.

The CISPR (Comité International Spécial des Perturbations Radioélectriques) – in English, the International Special Committee on Radio Interference – is one of the groups founded by the IEC.

Currently, 89 countries are IEC members while another 85 participate in the Affiliate Country Programme, which is not a form of membership but is designed to help industrializing countries get involved with the IEC. Originally located in London, the IEC moved to its current headquarters in Geneva, Switzerland in 1948.

It has regional centres in Africa (Nairobi, Kenya), Asia (Singapore), Oceania (Sydney, Australia), Latin America (São Paulo, Brazil) and North America (Worcester, Massachusetts, United States).

The work is done by some 10,000 electrical and electronics experts from industry, government, academia, test labs and others with an interest in the subject.

IEC Standards are often adopted as national standards by its members.

IEC Standards

The IEC cooperates closely with the International Organization for Standardization (ISO) and the International Telecommunication Union (ITU). In addition, it works with several major standards development organizations, including the IEEE with which it signed a cooperation agreement in 2002, which was amended in 2008 to include joint development work.

IEC Standards that are not jointly developed with ISO have numbers in the range 60000–79999 and their titles take a form such as IEC 60417: Graphical symbols for use on equipment. Following the Dresden Agreement with CENELEC the numbers of older IEC standards were converted in 1997 by adding 60000, for example IEC 27 became IEC 60027. Standards of the 60000 series are also found preceded by EN to indicate that the IEC standard is also adopted by CENELEC as a European standard; for example IEC 60034 is also available as EN 60034.

Standards developed jointly with ISO, such as ISO/IEC 26300 (Open Document Format for Office Applications (OpenDocument) v1.0), ISO/IEC 27001 (Information technology, Security techniques, Information security management systems, Requirements), and ISO/IEC 17000 series, carry the acronym of both organizations. The use of the ISO/IEC prefix covers publications from ISO/IEC Joint Technical Committee 1 – Information Technology, as well as conformity assessment standards developed by ISO CASCO (Committee on conformity assessment) and IEC CAB (Conformity Assessment Board). Other standards developed in cooperation between IEC and ISO are assigned numbers in the 80000 series, such as IEC 82045–1.

IEC Standards are also being adopted by other certifying bodies such as BSI (United Kingdom), CSA (Canada), UL & ANSI/INCITS (United States), SABS (South Africa), Standards Australia, SPC/GB (China) and DIN (Germany). IEC standards adopted by other certifying bodies may have some noted differences from the original IEC standard.

Membership and participation

The IEC is made up of members, called national committees, and each NC represents its nation's electrotechnical interests in the IEC. This includes manufacturers, providers, distributors and vendors, consumers and users, all levels of governmental agencies, professional societies and trade associations as well as standards developers from national standards bodies. National committees are constituted in different ways. Some NCs are public sector only, some are a combination of public and private sector, and some are private sector only. About 90% of those who prepare IEC standards work in industry. IEC Member countries include:

Full members

Associate members (limited voting and managerial rights)

Affiliates
In 2001 and in response to calls from the WTO to open itself to more developing nations, the IEC launched the Affiliate Country Programme to encourage developing nations to become involved in the commission's work or to use its International Standards. Countries signing a pledge to participate in the work and to encourage the use of IEC Standards in national standards and regulations are granted access to a limited number of technical committee documents for the purposes of commenting. In addition, they can select a limited number of IEC Standards for their national standards' library. Countries participating in the Affiliate Country Programme are:

 Afghanistan
 Angola
 Antigua and Barbuda
 Armenia
 Azerbaijan
 Barbados
 Belize
 Benin
 Bhutan
 Bolivia
 Botswana
 Brunei
 Burkina Faso
 Burundi
 Cabo Verde
 Cambodia
 Cameroon
 Central African Republic
 Chad
 Comoros
 Congo (Rep. of)
 Congo (Democratic Rep. of)
 Costa Rica
 Côte d'Ivoire
 Dominica
 Dominican Republic
 Ecuador
 El Salvador
 Eritrea
 Eswatini
 Fiji
 Gabon
 Grenada
 Guatemala
 Guinea
 Guinea Bissau
 Guyana
 Haiti
 Honduras
 Jamaica
 Kyrgyzstan
 Laos
 Lebanon
 Lesotho
 Madagascar
 Malawi
 Mali
 Mauritania
 Mauritius
 Mongolia
 Mozambique
 Myanmar
 Namibia
 Nepal
 Niger
 Palestine
 Panama
 Papua New Guinea
 Paraguay
 Rwanda
 Saint Lucia
 Saint Vincent and the Grenadines
 São Tomé and Príncipe
 Senegal
 Seychelles
 Sierra Leone
 South Sudan
 Sudan
 Suriname
 Syrian Arab Republic
 Tanzania
 The Gambia
 Togo
 Trinidad and Tobago
 Turkmenistan
 Uruguay
 Uzbekistan
 Venezuela
 Yemen
 Zambia
 Zimbabwe

Technical information 
 Graphical Symbols
 Hydraulic Turbines
 Switchgear 
 Dependability
 Power Systems Management
 Fibre Optics
 Audio, video and multimedia systems and equipment

Standards and tools published in database format 
 International Electrotechnical Vocabulary
 IEC Glossary
 IEC 60061: Lamp caps, lampholders and gauges
 IEC 60417 Graphical Symbols for Use on Equipment
 IEC 60617: Graphical Symbols for Diagrams

See also
 International Organization for Standardization
 International Telecommunication Union
 World Standards Cooperation
 List of IEC standards
 List of IEC technical committees

References

External links 

 

 
Electrical engineering organizations
Electrical safety standards organizations
International organisations based in Switzerland
Organisations based in Geneva